The legal status of transgender people varies greatly around the world. Some countries have enacted laws protecting the rights of transgender individuals, but others have criminalized their gender identity or expression. In many cases, transgender individuals face discrimination in employment, housing, healthcare, and other areas of life.

A transgender person is someone whose gender identity is inconsistent or not culturally associated with the sex they were assigned at birth and also with the gender role that is associated with that sex. They may have, or may intend to establish, a new gender status that accords with their gender identity. Transsexual is generally considered a subset of transgender, but some transsexual people reject being labelled transgender.

Globally, most legal jurisdictions recognize the two traditional gender identities and social roles, man and woman, but tend to exclude any other gender identities and expressions. However, there are some countries which recognize, by law, a third gender. That third gender is often associated with being nonbinary. There is now a greater understanding of the breadth of variation outside the typical categories of "man" and "woman", and many self-descriptions are now entering the literature, including pangender, genderqueer, polygender, and agender. Medically and socially, the term "transsexualism" is being replaced with gender incongruence or gender dysphoria, and terms such as transgender people, trans men, and trans women, and non-binary are replacing the category of transsexual people.

Most of the issues regarding transgender rights are generally considered a part of family law, especially the issues of marriage and the question of a transgender person benefiting from a partner's insurance or social security.

The degree of legal recognition provided to transgender people varies widely throughout the world.  Many countries now legally recognize sex reassignments by permitting a change of legal gender on an individual's birth certificate. Many transsexual people have permanent surgery to change their body, sexual reassignment surgery (SRS) or semi-permanently change their body by hormonal means, transgender hormone therapy (HRT). In many countries, some of these modifications are required for legal recognition. In a few, the legal aspects are directly tied to health care; i.e. the same bodies or doctors decide whether a person can move forward in their treatment and the subsequent processes automatically incorporate both matters.

In some jurisdictions, transgender people (who are considered non-transsexual) can benefit from the legal recognition given to transsexual people. In some countries, an explicit medical diagnosis of "transsexualism" is (at least formally) necessary. In others, a diagnosis of "gender dysphoria", or simply the fact that one has established a non-conforming gender role, can be sufficient for some or all of the legal recognition available. The DSM-5 recognizes gender dysphoria as an official diagnosis.

Legislative efforts to recognise gender identity

National level

Legislative efforts to derecognise gender identity

National level

Subnational level

Africa

South Africa

The Constitution of South Africa forbids discrimination on the basis of sex, gender and sexual orientation (amongst other grounds). The Constitutional Court has indicated that "sexual orientation" includes transsexuality.

In 2003 Parliament enacted the Alteration of Sex Description and Sex Status Act, which allows a transgender person who has undergone medical or surgical gender reassignment to apply to the Department of Home Affairs to have the sex description altered on their birth record. Once the birth record is altered they can be issued with a new birth certificate and identity document, and are considered "for all purposes" to be of the new sex.

Egypt

Transgender people face significant existing societal stigma against the LGBT+ community in Egypt, a conservative Muslim nation. The procedure for gender reassignment is not illegal in Egypt, however, the complication and stigmatisation has put transgender people through mental and physical assault along with torture, as per Human Rights Watch. Reportedly, the statistics of criminal acts committed against the transgender community have not been available because they have had a history of going unreported.

Botswana

In September 2017, the Botswana High Court ruled that the refusal of the Registrar of National Registration to change a transgender man's gender marker was "unreasonable and violated his constitutional rights to dignity, privacy, freedom of expression, equal protection of the law, freedom from discrimination and freedom from inhumane and degrading treatment". LGBT activists celebrated the ruling, describing it as a great victory. At first, the Botswana Government announced it would appeal the ruling, but decided against it in December, supplying the trans man in question with a new identity document that reflects his gender identity.

A similar case, where a transgender woman sought to change her gender marker to female, was heard in December 2017. The High Court ruled that the Government must recognise her gender identity. She dedicated her victory to "every single trans diverse person in Botswana".

Asia

China

In 2009 the Chinese government made it illegal for minors to change their officially listed gender, stating that sexual reassignment surgery, available to only those over the age of twenty, was required in order to apply for a revision of their identification card and residence registration.

In early 2014 the Shanxi province started allowing minors to apply for the change with the additional information of their guardian's identification card. This shift in policy allows post-surgery marriages to be recognized as heterosexual and therefore legal.

Transgender youth in China face many challenges. One study found that Chinese parents report 0.5%  (1:200) of their 6 to 12-year boys and 0.6%  (1:167) of girls often or always 'state the wish to be the other gender'. 0.8% (1:125) of 18- to 24-year-old university students who are birth-assigned males (whose sex/gender as indicated on their ID card is male) report that the 'sex/gender I feel in my heart'  is female, while another 0.4% indicating that their perceived gender was 'other'. Among birth-assigned females, 2.9% (1:34) indicated they perceived their gender as male, while another 1.3% indicating 'other'.

According to a survey conducted by Peking University, Chinese trans female students face strong discrimination in many areas of education. Sex segregation is found everywhere in Chinese schools and universities: student enrollment (for some special schools, universities and majors), appearance standards (hairstyles and uniforms included), private spaces (bathrooms, toilets and dormitories included), physical examintions, military trainings, conscription, PE classes, PE exams and physical health tests. Chinese students are required to attend all the activities according to their legal gender marker, otherwise they will be punished. It is also difficult to change the gender information of educational attainments and academic degrees in China, even after sex reassignment surgery, which results in discrimination against well-educated trans women.

Hong Kong

The Court of Final Appeal of Hong Kong ruled that a transsexual woman has the right to marry her boyfriend. The ruling was made on 13 May 2013.

On 16 September 2013, Eliana Rubashkyn a transgender woman claimed that she was discriminated and sexually abused by the customs officers, including being subjected to invasive body searches and denied usage of a female toilet, although Hong Kong officers denied the allegations. After being released, she applied for and was granted refugee status by the United Nations High Commissioner for Refugees (UNHCR), rendering her effectively stateless awaiting acceptance to a third country.

India 

In April 2014, the Supreme Court of India declared transgender to be a 'third gender' in Indian law. The transgender community in India (made up of Hijras and others) has a long history in India and in Hindu mythology.

The Transgender Persons (Protection of Rights) Act, 2019, was passed by Parliament in November 2019, and came into effect on 11 January 2020. It protects transgender individuals against discrimination in education, employment and healthcare. It recognizes the gender identity of the individual, and there are provisions in the law for a certificate to be issued with their new gender identity.  There have been reservations among some in the transgender community, both regarding the difficulty of obtaining a certificate, and because of lack of awareness and lack of sensitivity to the issue among local public officials. LGBTQ protests against the bill have occurred, with claims that the bill hurts the transgender community instead of helping it.  Protesters noted the provision for certification, but criticized the fact that this would require people to register with the government in order to be recognized as transgender. They also criticized the inequality in herent in the vast differences in punishment for the same crime, such as sexual abuse, committed against violating a transgender or cisgender individual.

Iran

Beginning in the mid-1980s, transgender individuals were officially recognized by the government and allowed to undergo sex reassignment surgery. 
Officially the leader of Iran's Islamic Revolution, Ayatollah Ruhollah Khomeini, issued a fatwa declaring sex reassignment surgery permissible for "diagnosed transsexuals". The government provides up to half the cost for those needing financial assistance, and a sex change is recognised on the birth certificate. Despite this, Iran's transgender people face discrimination in society. Founded in 2007 by Maryam Khatoon Molkara the Iranian Society to Support Individuals with Gender Identity Disorder (نجمن حمایت از بیماران مبتلا به اختلالات هویت جنسیایران) is Iran's main transsexual organization.

Additionally, the Iranian government's response to homosexuality is to pressure lesbian and gay individuals, who are not in fact transsexual, towards sex reassignment surgery. Eshaghian's documentary, Be Like Others, chronicles a number of stories of Iranian gay men who feel transitioning is the only way to avoid further persecution, jail, or execution. Maryam Khatoon Molkara—who convinced Khomeini to issue the fatwa on transsexuality—confirmed that some people who undergo operations are gay rather than transsexual.

Japan

On 10 July 2003, the National Diet of Japan unanimously approved a new law that enables transsexual people to amend their legal sex. It is called  (Act on Special Cases in Handling Gender for People with Gender Identity Disorder) The law, effective on 16 July 2004, however, has controversial conditions which demand the applicants be both unmarried and childless. On 28 July 2004, Naha Family Court in Okinawa Prefecture returned a verdict to a transsexual woman in her 20s, allowing the sex on her family registry record or koseki to be amended from male to female. It is generally believed to be the first court approval under the new law. Since 2018 sex reassignment surgeries are paid for by the Japanese government, which are covered by the Japanese national health insurance as long as patients are not receiving hormone treatment and do not have any other pre-existing conditions. However applicants are required to be at least 20 years old, single, sterile, have no children under 20 (the age of majority in Japan), as well as to undergo a psychiatric evaluation to receive a diagnosis of "Gender Identity Disorder", also known as gender dysphoria in western countries. Once completed the patient has to only pay 30% of the surgery costs.

Malaysia

There is no legislation expressly allowing transsexuals to legally change their gender in Malaysia. The relevant legislations are the Births and Deaths Registration Act 1957 and National Registration Act 1959. Therefore, judges currently exercise their discretion in interpreting the law and defining the gender. There are conflicting decisions on this matter. There is a case in 2003 where the court allowed a transsexual to change her gender indicated in the identity card, and granted a declaration that she is a female. However, in 2005, in another case, the court refused to amend the gender of a transsexual in the identity card and birth certificate. Both cases applied the United Kingdom case of Corbett v Corbett in defining legal gender.

Pakistan

In Pakistan, some members of the LGBT community have started undergoing acts of sex reassignment surgery to change their sex. There are situations where such cases have caused media attention. A 2008 ruling at Pakistan's Lahore High Court gave permission to Naureen, 28, to have a sex change operation, although the decision was applicable only towards individuals who were diagnosed with gender dysphoria.

In 2009, the Pakistan Supreme Court made a ruling in favor of the transgender community. The landmark ruling stated that as citizens they were entitled to the equal benefit and protection of the law and called upon the Pakistani government to take steps to protect transgender people from discrimination and harassment. Pakistan's chief justice, Iftikhar Chaudhry, was the architect of major extension of rights to Pakistan's transgender community during his term. There are also anti-discrimination laws in the provision of goods and services for transgender or transsexual individuals (known as Khuwaja Sira, formerly hijra, or Third Gender) in Pakistani.

In 2018, the Pakistani government passed the Transgender Person (Protection of Rights) Act which officially established the legal right of transgender people in Pakistan to identify themselves as such and instituted anti-discrimination laws. These include recognition of transgender identity in legal documents such as passports, identity card, and drivers licences, along with prohibiting discrimination in employment, schools, workplaces, public transit, healthcare, etc. The bill also included the right for inheritance in accordance to their chosen gender. Furthermore, the bill obligates the Pakistani government to build protection centers and safe houses for the specific purpose of being used by the transgender community in Pakistan.

Jordan

The Court of Cassation, the highest court in Jordan allowed a transsexual woman to change her legal name and sex to female in 2014 after she brought forth medical reports from Australia. The head of the Jordanian Department of civil Status and Passports stated that two to three cases of change of sex reach the department annually, all based on Medical Reports and Court orders.

Philippines

The Supreme Court of the Philippines Justice Leonardo Quisumbing on 12 September 2008, allowed Jeff Cagandahan, 27, to change his birth certificate, gender and name:We respect respondent's congenital condition and his mature decision to be a male. Life is already difficult for the ordinary person. We cannot but respect how respondent deals with his unordinary state and thus help make his life easier, considering the unique circumstances in this case. In the absence of a law on the matter, the court will not dictate on respondent concerning a matter so innately private as one's sexuality and lifestyle preferences, much less on whether or not to undergo medical treatment to reverse the male tendency due to rare medical condition, congenital adrenal hyperplasia. In the absence of evidence that respondent is an 'incompetent,' and in the absence of evidence to show that classifying respondent as a male will harm other members of society ... the court affirms as valid and justified the respondent's position and his personal judgment of being a male.

Court records showed that at age six, he had small ovaries; at 13, his ovarian structure was minimized, he had no breasts and did not menstruate. The psychiatrist testified that "he has both male and female sex organs, but was genetically female, and that since his body secreted male hormones, his female organs did not develop normally." The Philippines National Institutes of Health said "people with congenital adrenal hyperplasia lack an enzyme needed by the adrenal gland to make the hormones cortisol and aldosterone.

This ruling, however, only applied to cases involving congenital adrenal hyperplasia and other intersex situations. The Philippine Supreme Court has also ruled that Filipino citizens do not have the right to legally change their sex on official documents (driver's license, passport, birth certificate, Social Security records, etc.) if they are transsexual and have undergone sexual reassignment surgery. In 2007, the Court overruled a lower court decision and found that another individual could not legally change name and sex from male to female, as it would have "serious and wide-ranging legal and public policy consequences," citing the institution of marriage in particular.

South Korea

In South Korea, it is possible for transgender individuals to change their legal gender, although it depends on the decision of the judge for each case. Since the 1990s, however, it has been approved in most of the cases. The legal system in Korea does not prevent marriage once a person has changed their legal gender.

In 2006, the Supreme Court of Korea ruled that transsexuals have the right to alter their legal papers to reflect their reassigned sex. A trans woman can be registered, not only as female, but also as being "born as a woman".

While same-sex marriage is not approved by South Korean law, a transsexual woman obtains the marital status of 'female' automatically when she marries to a man, even if she has previously been designated as "male".

In 2013 a court ruled that transsexuals can change their legal sex without undergoing genital surgery.

Taiwan

Transgender people in Taiwan need to undergo genital surgery (removal of primary sex organs) in order to register gender change on both the identity card and the birth certificate. The surgery requires approval of two psychiatrists, and the procedure is not covered by the National Health Insurance. The government conducted public consultations on the elimination of surgery requirements back in 2015, but no concrete changes have been made since then.

In 2018, the government unveiled the new chip-embedded identity card, scheduled to be issued in late 2020. Gender will not be explicitly displayed on the physical card, although the second digit of national identification number reveals gender information anyway ("1" for male; "2" for female). With the inception of new identity card, a third gender option (using digit "7" as the second digit of national identification number) will be available to transgender persons alike. However, it raises concerns that the practice could stigmatize transgender persons, instead of respecting their gender identity. Details of the third-gender option policy are yet to be released.

After same-sex marriage law became effective on 24 May 2019, transgender persons could marry a person of the same registered gender.

Europe

A majority of countries in Europe give transgender people the right to at least change their first name, most of which also provide a way of changing birth certificates. Several European countries recognize the right of transgender people to marry in accordance with their post-operative sex. Croatia, Czech Republic, Denmark, Finland, France, Germany, Ireland, Italy, the Netherlands, Norway, Poland, Portugal, Romania, Sweden, Spain, and the United Kingdom all recognize this right. The Convention on the recognition of decisions regarding a sex change provides regulations for mutual recognition of sex change decisions and has been signed by five European countries and ratified by Spain and the Netherlands.

Finland

In Finland, people wishing to change their legal gender must be sterilized or "for some other reason infertile". A recommendation from the UN Human Rights Council to eliminate the sterilization requirement was rejected by the Finnish government in 2017.

France

In France, the change of the first name can be done by registry office or tribunal. The change of sex can be done by tribunal. In both cases there is no need for psychiatric reports or sex reassignment surgery.

Germany

In 1908, Imperial Germany (with the help of sexologist Magnus Hirschfeld and the WhK) issued a very limited number of 'transvestite passes' – transvestite at this time referring to crossdressers as well as transgender and gender non-conforming people – which enabled individuals to dress in clothes which were seen as discordant with their sex. This ended in 1933.

Since 1980, Germany has a law that regulates the change of first names and legal gender. It is called  (Law about the change of first name and determination of gender identity in special cases (Transsexual law – TSG)). Requirements that applicants for a change in gender were infertile post-surgery declared unconstitutional by supreme court ruling in a 2011.

Greece

On 10 October 2017, the Greek Parliament passed, by a comfortable majority, the Legal Gender Recognition Bill which grants the transgender people in Greece the right to change their legal gender freely by abolishing any conditions and requirements, such as undergoing any medical interventions, sex reassignment surgeries or sterilisation procedures to have their gender legally recognized on their IDs. The bill grants this right to anyone aged 17 and older. However, even underaged children between the age of 15 and 17 will have access to the legal gender recognition process, but under certain conditions, such as obtaining a certificate from a medical council. The bill was opposed by the Holy Synod of the Orthodox Church, the Communist Party of Greece, Golden Dawn and New Democracy.

The Legal Gender Recognition Bill followed a 20 July 2016 decision of the County Court of Athens, which ruled that a person who wants to change their legal gender on the Registry Office files is no longer obliged to already have undergone a sex reassignment surgery. This decision was applied by the Court on a case-by-case basis.

Republic of Ireland

In Ireland, it was not possible for a transsexual person to alter their birth certificate until 2015. The High Court took a case by Lydia Foy in 2002 that was turned down, as a birth certificate was deemed to be a historical document.

On 15 July 2015 Ireland passed the Gender Recognition Act, which allows legal gender changes without the requirement of medical intervention or assessment by the state. Such change is possible through self-determination for any person aged 18 or over resident in Ireland and registered on Irish registers of birth or adoption. Persons aged 16 to 18 years must secure a court order to exempt them from the normal requirement to be at least 18. Ireland is one of four legal jurisdictions in the world where people may legally change gender through self-determination.

Nordic countries
The Nordic model approach to transgender rights emphasizes the human rights of transgender people and is based on legal equality and self-identification, which has been adopted in countries such as Denmark, Greenland, Norway and Iceland. In 2014, the Danish Parliament voted 59–52 to remove the requirement of a mental disorder diagnosis and surgery with irreversible sterilization for transgender people who wish to change their legal gender. A similar act was adopted in Greenland in 2016. In Norway the Gender Recognition Act, that introduced self-identification, was introduced by the Conservative-led government of Erna Solberg and adopted in 2016. The act received widespread support from most political parties, the LGBTIQ+ rights movement and the feminist movement, including the Norwegian Association for Women's Rights. Transgender people are also protected against discrimination and hate speech under discrimination and criminal law. Iceland adopted the Gender Autonomy Act that introduced self-identification and a third legal gender option in 2019, which received widespread support, including from the Icelandic Women's Rights Association. The women's rights movement in the Nordic countries strongly supports transgender rights. In 2021 the Icelandic Women's Rights Association in cooperation with the International Alliance of Women organized a forum on how the women's movement could counter "anti-trans voices."

Poland

The first milestone sentence in the case of gender shifting was given by Warsaw's Voivode Court in 1964. The court reasoned that it be possible, in face of civil procedure and acting on civil registry records, to change one's legal gender after their genital reassignment surgery had been conducted. In 1983, the Supreme Court ruled that in some cases, when the attributes of the individual's preferred gender were predominant, it is possible to change one's legal gender even before genital reassignment surgery.

In 2011, Anna Grodzka, the first transgender MP in the history of Europe who underwent a genital reassignment operation was appointed. In the Polish Parliamentary Election 2011 she gained 19,337 votes (45,079 voted for her party in the constituency) in the City of Kraków and came sixth in her electoral district (928,914 people, voter turnout 55.75%). Grodzka was reportedly the only transsexual person with ministerial responsibilities in the world since 10 November 2011 (as of 2015).

Portugal

The law allows an adult person to change their legal gender without any requirements. Minors aged 16 and 17 are able to do so with parental consent and a psychological opinion, confirming that their decision has been taken freely and without any outside pressure. The law also prohibits both direct and indirect discrimination based on gender identity, gender expression and sex characteristics, and bans non-consensual sex assignment treatment and/or surgical intervention on intersex children.

Romania

In Romania it is legal for transgender people to change their first name to reflect their gender identity based on personal choice. Since 1996, it has been possible for someone who has gone through genital reassignment surgery to change their legal gender in order to reflect their post-operative sex. Transgender people then have the right to marry in accordance with their post-operative sex.

United Kingdom

The Sex Discrimination Act 1975 made it illegal to discriminate on the ground of anatomical sex in employment, education, and the provision of housing, goods, facilities and services. The Equality Act 2006 introduced the Gender Equality Duty in Scotland, which required public bodies to take seriously the threat of harassment or discrimination against transsexual people in various situations. In 2008 the Sex Discrimination (Amendment of Legislation) Regulations extended existing regulation to outlaw discrimination when providing goods or services to transsexual people. The Equality Act 2010 added "gender reassignment" as a "protected characteristic".

The Gender Recognition Act 2004 effectively granted full legal recognition for binary transgender people. In contrast to some systems elsewhere in the world, the gender recognition process under the Act does not require applicants to be post-operative. There must, however, be significant medical explanation as to why an individual has not undergone sex reassignment surgery. They need only demonstrate that they have suffered gender dysphoria, have lived as "your new gender" for two years, and intend to continue doing so until death.

North America

Canada

Jurisdiction over legal classification of sex in Canada is assigned to the provinces and territories. This includes legal change of gender classification.

On 19 June 2017 Bill C-16, after having passed the legislative process in the House of Commons of Canada and the Senate of Canada, became law upon receiving Royal Assent which put it into immediate force. The law updated the Canadian Human Rights Act and the Criminal Code to include "gender identity and gender expression" as protected grounds from discrimination, hate publications and advocating genocide. The bill also added "gender identity and expression" to the list of aggravating factors in sentencing, where the accused commits a criminal offence against an individual because of those personal characteristics. Similar transgender laws also exist in all the provinces and territories. Conversion therapy is banned in the provinces of Manitoba, Ontario, and Nova Scotia, and the city of Vancouver, though the Nova Scotia law includes a clause which allows "mature minors" between the ages of 16 and 18 to consent.

Mexico

Jurisdiction over legal classification of sex in Mexico is assigned to the states and Mexico City. This includes legal change of gender classification.

On 13 March 2004, amendments to the Mexico City Civil Code that allow transgender people to change their gender and name on their birth certificates, took effect.

In September 2008, the PRD-controlled Mexico City Legislative Assembly approved a law, in a 37–17 vote, making gender changes easier for transgender people.

On 13 November 2014, the Legislative Assembly of Mexico City unanimously (46–0) approved a gender identity law. The law makes it easier for transgender people to change their legal gender. Under the new law, they simply have to notify the Civil Registry that they wish to change the gender information on their birth certificates. Sex reassignment surgery, psychological therapies or any other type of diagnosis are no longer required. The law took effect in early 2015. On 13 July 2017, the Michoacán Congress approved (22–1) a gender identity law. Nayarit approved (23–1) a similar law on 20 July 2017.

United States

On 15 June 2020, the Supreme Court of the United States (SCOTUS) ruled in Bostock v. Clayton County that for the purposes of Title VII of the Civil Rights Act of 1964, discrimination on the basis of transgender status is also discrimination because of sex.

Regardless of the legal sex classification determined by a state or territory, the federal government may make its own determination of sex classification for federally issued documents. For instance, the U.S. Department of State requires a medical certification of "appropriate clinical treatment for transition to the updated gender (male or female)" to amend the gender designation on a U.S. passport, but sex reassignment surgery is not a requirement to obtain a U.S. passport in the updated gender. This leaves transgender Americans subject to inconsistent and often discriminatory regulations when seeking healthcare.

South America
South America has some of the most progressive legislation in the world regarding transgender rights. Bolivia and Ecuador are among the few countries worldwide that offer constitutional protection against discrimination based on gender identity. Transgender persons are allowed to change their name and gender on legal documents in a majority of countries. Argentina, Brazil, Bolivia, Chile, Colombia, Ecuador and Uruguay allow individuals to change their name and gender without undergoing medical treatment, sterilization or judicial permission. In Peru a judicial order is required.

Argentina

In 2012 the Argentine Congress passed the Ley de Género (Gender Law), which allows individuals over 18 to change the gender marker in their DNI (national ID) on the basis of a written declaration only. Argentina thus became the first country to adopt a gender recognition policy based entirely on individual autonomy, without any requirement for third party diagnosis, surgeries or obstacles of any type.

Bolivia

The Gender Identity law allows individuals over 18 to legally change their name, gender and photography on legal documents.  No surgeries or judicial order are required. The law took effect on 1 August 2016.

Brazil

Changing legal gender assignment in Brazil is legal according to the Superior Court of Justice of Brazil, as stated in a decision rendered on 17 October 2009.

And in 2008, Brazil's public health system started providing free sexual reassignment operations in compliance with a court order. Federal prosecutors had argued that sexual reassignment surgery was covered under a constitutional clause guaranteeing medical care as a basic right.

Patients must be at least 18 years old and diagnosed as transsexuals with no other personality disorders, and must undergo psychological evaluation with a multidisciplinary team for at least two years, begins with 16 years old. 
The national average is of 100 surgeries per year, according to the Ministry of Health of Brazil.

In December 2020, a bill was introduced that defines biological sex as the only factor in determining gender.

Chile

Chile bans all discrimination and hate crimes based on gender identity and gender expression. The Gender Identity Law, in effect since 2019, recognizes the right to self-perceived gender identity, allowing people over 14 years to change their name and gender on all official documents without prohibitive requirements. Since 1974, the change of gender had been possible in the country through a judicial process.

Colombia

Since 2015, a Colombian person may change their legal gender and name manifesting their solemn will before a notar, no surgeries or judicial order required.

Ecuador

Since 2016, Ecuadorians are allowed to change their birth name and gender identity (instead of the sex assigned at birth) on legal documents and national ID cards. The person who wants to change the word "sex" for "gender" in the identity card shall present two witnesses to accredit the self-determination of the applicant.

Peru

In Peru transgender persons can change their legal gender and name after complying with certain requirements that may become psychological and psychiatric evaluations, a medical intervention or sex reassignment surgery. A judicial permission is required.
In November 2016, the Constitutional Court of Peru determined that transsexuality is not a pathology and recognized the right to gender identity. However, favorable judicial decisions on gender change have been appealed.

Uruguay

Since 2019, transgender people can self-identify their gender and update their legal name, without approval from a judge after the approval of the Comprehensive Law for Trans Persons. The new law creates scholarships for trans people to access education, a monthly pension for transgender people born before 1975 and also requires government services to employ a minimum of 1% of the transgender population. It also now acknowledges the self-identification of non-binary people.

In October 2009, lawmakers passed the Gender identity law allowing transgender people over the age of 18 to change their name and legal gender on all official documents. Surgery, diagnosis or hormone therapy were not a requirement but a judicial permission was required.

Oceania

Australia

Birth certificates are regulated by the states and territories, whereas marriage and passports are matters for federal law. All Australian jurisdictions now recognise the affirmed sex of an individual, with varying requirements. In the landmark case New South Wales Registrar of Births, Deaths and Marriages v Norrie [2014] the High Court of Australia held that the Births Deaths and Marriages Registration Act 1995 (NSW) did not require a person having undergone genital reassignment surgery to identify as either a man or a woman. The ruling permits a gender registration of "non-specific".

Passports are issued in the preferred gender, without requiring a change to birth certificates or citizenship certificates.  A letter is needed from a medical practitioner which certifies that the person has had or is receiving appropriate treatment.

Australia was the only country in the world to require the involvement and approval of the judiciary (Family Court of Australia) with respect to allowing transgender children access to hormone replacement therapy. This ended in late 2017, when the Family Court issued a landmark ruling establishing that, in cases where there is no dispute between a child, their parents, and their treating doctors, hormone treatment can be prescribed without court permission.

Fiji

The Constitution of Fiji which was promulgated in September 2013 includes a provision banning discrimination based on sexual orientation and gender identity or expression.

Guam

Gender changes are legal in Guam. In order for transgender people to change their legal gender in Guam, they must provide the Office of Vital Statistics a sworn statement from a physician that they have undergone sex reassignment surgery. The Office will subsequently amend the birth certificate of the requester.

New Zealand

Currently, the Human Rights Act 1993 does not explicitly prohibit discrimination on the basis of gender. Whilst it is believed that gender identity is protected under the laws preventing discrimination on the basis of either sex or sexual orientation, it is not known how this applies to those who have not had, or will not have, gender reassignment surgery.

Northern Mariana Islands

Transgender persons in the Northern Mariana Islands may change their legal gender following sex reassignment surgery and a name change. The Vital Statistics Act of 2006, which took effect in March 2007, states that: "Upon receipt of a certified copy of an order of the CNMI Superior Court indicating the sex of an individual born in the CNMI has been changed by surgical procedure and whether such individual's name has been changed, the certificate of birth of such individual shall be amended as prescribed by regulation."

Samoa

In Samoa crimes motivated by sexual orientation and/or gender identity are criminalized under Section 7(1)(h) of the Sentencing Act 2016.

See also

 Gender Public Advocacy Coalition—Defunct US advocacy group working to end discrimination and violence caused by gender stereotypes by changing public attitudes, educating elected officials, and expanding human rights
Legal Precedent (2009), Right to change legal names female to male and vice versa for people transgender and intersex by the approval of the 2008 Constitution of Ec­or.
 Gender diversity
 Legal recognition of non-binary gender
 LGBT people in prison
 LGBT rights by country or territory—including gender identity/expression
 List of transgender-related topics
 List of transgender-rights organizations
 Transgender asylum seekers
 Transgender inequality
 Transgender rights movement
 Transitioning (transgender)
 Yogyakarta Principles
 Human rights

References

Notes

Footnotes

Works cited
 Chow, Melinda. (2005). "Smith v. City of Salem: Transgendered Jurisprudence and an Expanding Meaning of Sex Discrimination under Title VII". Harvard Journal of Law & Gender. Vol. 28. Winter. 207.
 
 
 

 
Transgender law
Transgender studies